Escape from Evil is the third studio album by Baltimore indie rock band Lower Dens. It was released in March 2015 under Domino Recording Company's Ribbon Music label. It was produced by the band's lead singer Jana Hunter and Chris Coady.

Critical reception
Stephen Carlick of Exclaim! called the record "the closest thing to pop music they've made yet", praising their push into new sonic territory as "the mark of any great band."

Track listing

Personnel
 Jana Hunter – vocals, producer
 Nate Nelson – drums
 Geoff Graham – bass
 Walker Teret – guitar, additional producing (track 1)
 Chris Coady – producer, mixing
 John Congleton – additional producing (tracks 1, 6), additional recording
 Ariel Rechtshaid – additional producing (track 2)
 Sarah Register – mixing
 Chris Freeland – recording
 Bo Hill – engineer 
 David Tolomei – engineer
 Hermonie Williams – cover, artwork

References

2015 albums
Lower Dens albums
Albums produced by Chris Coady
Experimental pop albums